Maberly may refer to:

 Maberly, Ontario, Canada
 Maberly, Newfoundland and Labrador, Canada
 Maberly (surname)
 Thrupp & Maberly, British coachbuilding company